Liquid Time is a 2002 avant-garde surf film that focuses solely on the fluid forms of tubing waves. Brothers Monty Webber and Greg Webber revived a childhood passion for perfectly formed tiny waves by filming the wake of their runabout as it pealed along the edge of a river sandbank. The 20-minute film received the Cinematography Award at the Saint Jean de Luz Surf Film Festival (2004 Edition).

Quotes from the DVD cover 
"Mind-boggling! I must say I don't think I've seen a film that is so beautiful. If there were Academy Awards given out for photography, editing, concept and music in the surfing arena, Liquid Time would take the lot." Alby Falzon
"Fascinating! Those microwaves break new ground in surf film. The music, the complete camera techniques. A superb job." George Greenough
 "Damn it, man. You've made something so beautiful." Jack McCoy
"It's hypnotically fascinating. The slow movements of the lip coming down are just mesmerizing." Paul Witzig

References 

Documentary films about surfing
Water waves
Australian surfing films